The Extraordinary and Plenipotentiary Ambassador of Peru to the Republic of Korea is the official representative of the Republic of Peru to the Republic of Korea.

Peru and South Korea established relations in 1963, and have maintained them since. Peru has an embassy in Seoul, and Korea has an embassy in Lima.

List of representatives

See also
List of ambassadors of Peru to North Korea
List of ambassadors of South Korea to Peru

References

South Korea
Peru